The Huangshui River or Huang Shui is a river in Qinghai and Gansu, China.

Etymology
The Huangshui River is also referred to simply as Huang River in China.  The river was formerly romanized as the Hwong-Choui.  In Amdo Tibetan, the Huangshui is known as the Tsong Chu.

History

The Huangshui River valley has long been important as a route between Chinese, Tibetan, and Mongolian cultures.  As one of the few fertile valleys on the northeast edge of the Qinghai-Tibet Plateau, the river's basin has supported agriculture for various Neolithic and Bronze Age civilizations including the Majiayao culture, Qijia culture, Xindian culture, and Kayue culture.  Huangshui's valley was also one of the routes utilized by travelers on the Northern Silk Road.  The city of Xining formed on the Huangshui due to its strategic importance.

Geography
The Huangshui River, in name, is a short river that rises in Qinghai's Daban Mountains in Haiyan County, Haibei.  The river flows east through Xining and Haidong before joining with the Yellow River just upstream from Lanzhou.  The Huangshui's primary tributary, the Datong River, is actually longer in length than the Huangshui and thus forms the main stem.  The Datong and Huangshui meet on the Qinghai-Gansu border between Minhe and Honggu.

References

Rivers of Qinghai
Tributaries of the Yellow River